Norman Friedman (born 1946) is an American internationally known author and analyst, strategist, and historian. He has written over 30 books and numerous articles on naval and other military matters, has worked for the U.S. Navy and Marine Corps, and has appeared on television programs including PBS, the Discovery Channel, C-SPAN, and National Geographic.

Background

Friedman holds a bachelor's and a doctorate from Columbia University in theoretical physics, completing his dissertation Additional Scattering of Bloch Electrons by Simultaneous Imputity and Lattice Interaction in 1974. From 1973 to 1984, he was at the Hudson Institute, becoming Deputy Director for National Security Affairs.  He then worked for the United States Navy as in-house consultant. From 2002 to 2004, he served as a futurologist for the United States Marine Corps. He has held the position of Visiting Professor of Operations Research, University College, University of London.

Friedman's articles have appeared in Joint Forces Quarterly, Jane's International Defence Review, Asian Pacific Defence Reporter, Defense Electronics, The Journal of Electronic Defense, The International Countermeasures Handbook, Armada, Defence, ORBIS, Military Technology, Naval Forces, Jane's Navy International, Signal, The Wall Street Journal (U.S., European, and Far Eastern editions), DPA, RUSI Journal, and the Journal of Cold War Studies, among others.

Awards and honors
 Fifty-Year War: Conflict and Strategy in the Cold War won the 2001 Duke of Westminster's Medal for Military Literature for the best military history book of 2000 from the British Royal United Services Institute.Seapower As Strategy: Navies and National Interests won the 2002 Samuel Eliot Morison Award for Naval Literature

Selected bibliography

 
 
 
 U.S. Amphibious Ships and Craft: An Illustrated Design History, 
 U.S. Aircraft Carriers: An Illustrated Design History, 
 U.S. Battleships: An Illustrated Design History, 
 U.S. Small Combatants, Including PT Boats, Subchasers, and the Brown-Water Navy: An Illustrated Design History,   
 U.S. Naval Weapons, 
 U.S. Naval Weapons: Every Gun, Missile, Mine and Torpedo Used by the U.S. Navy from 1883 to the Present Day,  
 Naval Radar, 
 American and British Aircraft Carrier Development, 1919–1941, 
 Battleship Design and Development 1905–1945, 
 Modern Warship: Design and Development, 
 Submarine Design and Development, 
 Seapower as Strategy: Navies and National Interests, 
 The US Maritime Strategy, 
 Postwar Naval Revolution, 
 Fifty-Year War: Conflict and Strategy in the Cold War, 
 Desert Victory: The War for Kuwait, 
 Terrorism, Afghanistan, and America's New Way of War, 
 Naval Firepower: Battleship Guns and Gunnery in the Dreadnought Era, 
 Naval Weapons of World War One: Guns, Torpedoes, Mines and ASW Weapons of All Nations, 
 Network-Centric Warfare: How Navies Learned to Fight Smarter Through Three World Wars, 
 British Carrier Aviation: The Evolution of the Ships and Their Aircraft, 
 The British Battleship: 1906–1946, 
 British Cruisers of the Victorian Era, 
 British Cruisers: Two World Wars and After, 
 British Destroyers: From Earliest Days to the Second World War, 
 British Destroyers and Frigates: The Second World War and After, 
 Fighting the Great War at Sea: Strategy, Tactics and Technology'',

See also
 Naval History (magazine)

References

External links
  US Naval Institute Listing
 
 

Living people
1946 births
American naval historians
American male non-fiction writers
Naval Postgraduate School
Naval warfare
American futurologists
Columbia College (New York) alumni
Columbia Graduate School of Arts and Sciences alumni